The Paul Gauguin Cultural Center was finished in 2003, to coincide with the 100th anniversary of the death of Paul Gauguin, in Atuona, on Hiva Oa, in the Marquesas Islands (French Polynesia).

Atuona was Paul Gauguin's home for the last three years of his life, and he is buried in the cemetery (Calvary Cemetery, French: Cimetière Calvaire) there.

See also 

 Paul Gauguin Museum, Tahiti, French Polynesia.

External links 
 Gauguin Cultural Center

Marquesan culture
Gauguin, Paul, Cultural Centre
Art museums and galleries in French Polynesia
Buildings and structures completed in 2003
Art museums established in 2003
2003 establishments in French Polynesia
Paul Gauguin
21st-century architecture in France